Expedition 19 was the 19th long-duration flight to the International Space Station. This expedition launched on 26 March 2009, at 11:49 UTC aboard the Soyuz TMA-14 spacecraft. Expedition 19 was the final three crew member expedition, before the crew size increased to six crew members with Expedition 20.

The expedition was commanded by Russian Air Force Colonel Gennady Padalka. On 31 March 2009, Padalka raised an issue concerning shared use of facilities such as exercise equipment and toilet facilities. Padalka claims that initial approval to use exercise equipment owned by the U.S. government was subsequently turned down. Russian and American members of the crew have now been informed to use only their own toilets and not to share rations. The result was a general lowering of morale on the station.

Crew

Backup crew
 Maksim Surayev - Commander - RSA (For Padalka)
 Jeffrey Williams - Flight Engineer - NASA (For Barratt)
 Soichi Noguchi - Flight Engineer - JAXA (For Wakata)

References

External links

 NASA Expedition 19 Main Page
 NASA's Space Station Expeditions page
 Expedition 19 Photography

Expeditions to the International Space Station
2009 in spaceflight